The triplespot wrasse (Halichoeres trispilus), also known as the white wrasse, is a species of wrasse native to the western Indian Ocean from South Africa to the Maldives and Mauritius. It can reach  in total length.

References

Triplespot wrasse
Taxa named by John Ernest Randall
Taxa named by Margaret Mary Smith
Fish described in 1982